Sportclub Heerenveen (West Frisian: Sportklub It Hearrenfean) is a Dutch football club from Heerenveen. They currently play in the Eredivisie, the top level of football in the Netherlands. The club is known for its Frisian identity.

History
Sportclub Heerenveen was founded on 20 July 1920 in the town of Heerenveen, Friesland, as Athleta. It changed name twice, first to Spartaan and then to v.v. Heerenveen in 1922. While the Netherlands was occupied by Germany, Heerenveen won three successive North of the Netherlands championships, and following the end of World War II it went on to win the same title six times in a row; the club's dominance partly ascribed to the presence of Abe Lenstra. During this period, Lenstra led Heerenveen to a famous victory over Ajax in one of the most noted games in Dutch domestic football history. Trailing 5–1 with 25 minutes remaining, the Frisian team inexplicably fought back for a 6–5 victory.

During the 1950s, Heerenveen regional dominance faded and after Dutch football turned professional Lenstra left to join Sportclub Enschede, before the club he departed was relegated to the Tweede Divisie. By the end of the decade, Heerenveen was in the Eerste Divisie, but found itself relegated again. In 1969–70, the Frisian club won the Tweede Divisie to return to the Eerste Divisie and for two seasons in the 1970s, the club was close to achieving promotion to the top-flight Eredivisie. By 1974, the club was in financial trouble and to ensure its survival it was split into amateur and professional sections on 1 June 1977, the professional part being renamed sc Heerenveen.

In the 1980s, Heerenveen twice made the promotion playoffs, but were unsuccessful both times. It finally reached the Eredivisie in 1990, becoming the first Frisian club to reach the top level, at the expense of near-neighbours Cambuur. The achievement was overseen by Frisian coach Foppe de Haan. Heerenveen's first season in the Netherlands' top division was not at all successful and it was relegated, before returning in 1993, though they reached the final of the KNVB Cup while still an Eerste Divisie club. Having established itself as a top-flight club, Heerenveen moved to a new stadium, named after their most celebrated player, the Abe Lenstra Stadion, and reached the final of the KNVB Cup for a second time. The 1998 semi-final in the cup competition was lost to Ajax. Because Ajax and the other finalist, PSV, had both qualified for the cup final, a decision match was needed to fill in the vacant spot for the next season's UEFA Cup Winners' Cup. Heerenveen had to play against the other losing semi-finalist, Twente. Heerenveen won that match in which Ruud van Nistelrooy scored his last goal for Heerenveen. The match ended 3–1.

Heerenveen became regular competitors in the UEFA Cup, and in 1999–2000 finished second in the Eredivisie, its highest ever finish, and qualified for the 2000–01 UEFA Champions League.

The club was led from 1983 until September 2006 by president Riemer van der Velde, the longest tenure of any president with a professional club in the Netherlands. As the results of recent transfers that include Klaas-Jan Huntelaar, Afonso Alves, Michael Bradley, Miralem Sulejmani, Petter Hansson and Danijel Pranjić (and earlier players like Jon Dahl Tomasson, Marcus Allbäck, Erik Edman, Ruud van Nistelrooy, Igor Korneev and Daniel Jensen), Heerenveen is one of the most financially secure Eredivisie clubs. A 2010 report by the Dutch football association showed that Heerenveen is the only Eredivisie club that has a financially secure budget. Under the tenure of Trond Sollied, Heerenveen won its first KNVB Cup, also its first ever major trophy. Trond Sollied, however, was sacked on 31 August 2009 due to a weak opening of the season and a conflict with the board.

On 17 May 2009, the club defeated Twente 5–4 in a penalty shoot-out to win the Dutch Cup for the first time after a 2–2 draw in the final, with Gerald Sibon scoring the winning penalty. On 13 February 2012, it was announced that Marco van Basten would replace Ron Jans, who had led Heerenveen for two years, as team manager for the 2012–13 season.

Stadium

The club plays its home matches at the Abe Lenstra Stadium, which opened in 1994 and holds 26,100 people. Before that, the team played at a ground with the same name elsewhere in the town, but it could not meet the increasing popularity of the club. Throughout the years, the club developed several plans to further expand the stadium. One of the plans was to extend at least one side stand towards the pitch, as seen in English football stadiums. Due to deteriorating league results and financial limitedness, however, those plans were shelved. It is uncertain whether or not the club will ever carry them out. Before the move to the Abe Lenstra Stadion, Heerenveen played at the Sportpark Noord. The club's training facilities are regarded as world class, which is said to be a major factor in their recruitment of younger players. The name of the clubs facilities is sportpark . The facilities are shared with VV Heerenveen and sc Heerenveen (women).

Colours, crest and anthem
The crest on the club emblem is the symbol of the flag of Friesland. The flag of Friesland is based on the arms of the 15th century. The stripes and seeblatt shapes represent the districts of Friesland.

A unique tradition in the Dutch Eredivisie is that the Frisian national anthem is played and sung before every domestic match. UEFA does not allow this tradition in European matches. Nevertheless, the anthem is sung by the supporters anyway.

Rivalry

SC Cambuur 
Heerenveen retain a very fierce rivalry with SC Cambuur. One of the reasons of the rivalry is the short distance between the two clubs. Because of that the clubs often refer to each other as DKV which stands for Dertig Kilometer Verderop (Thirty Kilometers Away) so that they don't have to mention each other's names. However, the biggest and also the most confusing reason is the background of the clubs. Many people who aren't involved in the rivalry find it difficult to understand. Most of the Heerenveen fans are from small villages from the entire province (and even outside it) and are very proud of their Frisian identity. Since the 80's the club have been expressing this Frisian pride to the rest of the Netherlands. The Frisian flag, the Frisian anthem, all Frisian symbols were linked to the club, which made Heerenveen the face of Frisia. Because of this Cambuur slowly disappeared in the shadow of Heerenveen, as a reaction to this Cambuur fans started distancing themselves from the Frisian identity. Nowadays Cambuur don't consider themselves Frisian even though they are from the capital of the province. They now call themselves Leeuwarders aka people from the city. Heerenveen fans are mockingly called boeren (farmers) because Heerenveen isn't a city and the fans mainly live in small villages. Because of the successes of Heerenveen and the meager performances of Cambuur including almost going bankrupt, the rivalry was almost forgotten. When Cambuur got promoted back to the Eredivisie in 2013 by winning the 2012/13 season of the Jupiler League the rivalry got revived. Before the meeting on 29 September 2013 the game hadn't been played for 13 years, giving Cambuur a great opportunity to prove themselves. Heerenveen won that game 2–1. The away game later in the season was won 3-1 by Cambuur.

FC Groningen
The absence of Cambuur caused FC Groningen to be the nearest Eredivisie team and soon it became rivals with Heerenveen. Strikingly, both northern sides used to maintain more or less of a friendship in the past. Therefore, this Northern Derby rivalry is only based on geographical location. Because most Heerenveen fans have always considered Cambuur as main rivals, this derby is often referred to as a surrogate derby. Traditionally, the winner claims the title Pride of the North.
Days before the game, Heerenveen and Groningen fans tease each other by means of playful actions, usually with no violence. The front yard of a Groningen chairman once got filled with rubble from a construction site. This was because the construction of the Euroborg had to be halted due to a major design mistake. Groningen fans countered by painting a statue of all-time Heerenveen hero Abe Lenstra green and white, the colours of Groningen. They also transformed a viaduct near Heerenveen to green and white.

A year later, in the 2001–02 season, Groningen fans awarded Heerenveen player Anthony Lurling the title of "Biggest cheat of the season" and handed him therefore a sewing machine. In that same week the town signs of Heerenveen were changed to "Hoerenveen It Sucks" (Whore-veen) by the Groningen supporters. The following season, Groningen fans teased the Heerenveen following again, this time by establishing a border post on the border of Groningen and Friesland.

Honours
Netherlands Football League Championship / Eredivisie
Runners-up (3): 1946–47, 1947–48, 1999–2000
KNVB Cup
Champions (1): 2008–09
Runners-up (2): 1992–93, 1996–97
Eerste Divisie
Play-off Winners (2): 1989–90, 1992–93
Runners-up (1): 1980–81
Tweede Divisie
Champions (1): 1969–70
Play-off Winners (1): 1959–60

Domestic results
Below is a table with sc Heerenveen's domestic results since the introduction of the Eredivisie in 1956.

European competition
SC Heerenveen played 16 seasons in one of the European club football competitions.
 score marked with * = first played match

  Due to safety concerns in Israel, the first leg was cancelled by UEFA.
  Played in Estádio José Alvalade, Lisbon.

Current squad

Notable former players
Players listed below have had junior and/or senior international cap(s) for their respective countries before, while and/or after playing at Heerenveen. 

 Raphael Bove
 Thomas Prager
 Sven Kums
 Brian Vandenbussche
 Afonso Alves
 Ivan Tsvetkov
 Tristan Borges
 Rob Friend
 Will Johnson
 Cecilio Lopes
 Danijel Pranjić
 Martin Lejsal
 Michal Papadopulos
 Michal Švec
 Kristian Bak Nielsen
 Daniel Jensen
 Allan K. Jepsen
 Hjalte Nørregaard
 Marc Nygaard
 Jakob Poulsen
 Lasse Schöne
 Ole Tobiasen
 Jon Dahl Tomasson
 Sergei Mošnikov
 Hannu Haarala
 Mika Nurmela
 Juska Savolainen
 Niklas Tarvajärvi
 Mika Väyrynen
 Mark Uth
 Matthew Amoah
 Georgios Samaras
 Lesly Fellinga
 Arnór Smárason
 Alfred Finnbogason
 Reza Ghoochannejhad
 Bonaventure Kalou
 Yuki Kobayashi
 Ibrahim Drešević
 Arbër Zeneli
 Samir Fazli
 Mile Krstev
 Goran Popov
 Oussama Assaidi
 Ali Elkhattabi
 Abdelkarim Kissi
 Khalid Sinouh
 Oussama Tannane
 Hakim Ziyech
 Mario Been
 Roy Beerens
 Paul Bosvelt
 Arnold Bruggink
 Jerry de Jong
 Marten de Roon
 Romano Denneboom
 Bas Dost
 Denzel Dumfries
 Germ Hofma
 Klaas-Jan Huntelaar
 Daryl Janmaat
 Kees Kist
 Martin Koeman
 Abe Lenstra
 Henny Meijer
 Luciano Narsingh
 Andries Noppert
 Victor Sikora
 Jeffrey Talan
 Henk Timmer
 René van der Gijp
 Ruud van Nistelrooy
 Uğur Yıldırım
 Emmanuel Ebiede
 Henry Onwuzuruike
 Daniel Berg Hestad
 Tarik Elyounoussi
 Christian Grindheim
 Thomas Holm
 Martin Ødegaard
 Radosław Matusiak
 Arkadiusz Radomski
 Tomasz Rząsa
 Ioan Andone
 Rodion Cămătaru
 Florin Constantinovici
 Dumitru Mitriță
 Igor Korneev
 Filip Đuričić
 Igor Đurić
 Miralem Sulejmani
 Hans Vonk
 Marcus Allbäck
 Erik Edman
 Viktor Elm
 Petter Hansson
 Lasse Nilsson
 Stefan Selaković
 Michael Bradley
 Robbie Rogers
 Radoslav Samardžić
 Đoàn Văn Hậu

Club staff

Coaching history 

No official trainer (1920–30)
 Sjoerd van Zuylen (1930–32)
 Sid Castle (1932)
 Otto Pinter (1932–33)
 Dirk Steenbergen (1934)
 Theo Eikenaar (1934–36)
 Sid Castle (1936–38)
 Piet Smit (1938–39)
 Anton Dalhuysen (1939–45)
 Otto Bonsema (1945)
 Abe Lenstra (1946–47)
 Piet van der Munnik (1947–51)
 Bob Kelly (1951–55)
 Volgert Ris (1955–58)
 Siem Plooijer (1958–61)
 Arie de Vroet (1961–63)
 Evert Mur (1963–65)
 László Zalai (1965–66)
 Ron Groenewoud (1966–67)
 Evert Teunissen (1967–69)
 Bas Paauwe Jr. (1969–71)
 Meg de Jongh (1971–73)
  (1973–78)
 Jan Teunissen (1978–80)
 Hylke Kerkstra (interim) (1980)
 Henk van Brussel (1980–85)
 Foppe de Haan (1985–88)
 Ted Immers (1988–89)
  (1989–90)
 Fritz Korbach (1 July 1990 – 30 June 1992)
 Foppe de Haan (18 October 1992 – 30 June 2004)
 Gertjan Verbeek (1 July 2004 – 30 June 2008)
 Trond Sollied (1 July 2008 – 31 August 2009)
 Jan de Jonge (31 August 2009 – 3 February 2010)
 Jan Everse (int.) (5 February 2010 – 30 June 2010)
 Ron Jans (1 July 2010 – 30 June 2012)
 Marco van Basten (1 July 2012 – 30 June 2014)
 Dwight Lodeweges (1 July 2014 – 20 October 2015)
 Foppe de Haan (int.) (20 October 2015 – 30 June 2016)
 Jurgen Streppel (1 July 2016 – 30 June 2018)
 Jan Olde Riekerink (1 July 2018 – 10 April 2019)
 Johnny Jansen (10 April 2019 – 24 January 2022)
 Ole Tobiasen (int.) (4 February 2022 – 30 June 2022)

 Kees van Wonderen (1 July 2022 - Present)

Match statistics 
 All competitions
 Biggest home win: SC Heerenveen - FC Oss 11–1; KNVB Cup (21 December 2011)
 Biggest score: Ton Pentre AFC - sc Heerenveen 0–7; Intertoto (2 July 1995)
 Largest double result: Helsingborg IF - sc Heerenveen 8-6 (3-5 and 5–1); UEFA Cup 1st Round (2007)
 Most goals in a season: 88 goals, 2007/08
 Most goals in a game: Afonso Alves 7 (also Dutch record); sc Heerenveen - Heracles (7 October 2007)

 Eredivisie
 Biggest home win: sc Heerenveen - Heracles Almelo 9-0 (7 October 2007)
 Biggest game: Willem II - sc Heerenveen 1-6 (23 February 2001)
 Largest home defeat: SC Heerenveen - AFC Ajax 0-5 (11 April 2012)
 Fastest penalty for: sc Heerenveen - sc Cambuur (19 October 2014)

 Champions League
 Biggest home win: SC Heerenveen - Olympiakos Piraeus 1-0 (17 October 2000)
 Most spacious stay: none
 Highest draw: Valencia CF - sc Heerenveen 1-1 (7 November 2000)
 Largest double result: SC Heerenveen - Olympique Lyon 1-5 (2000)

 European Cup II
 Biggest home win: SC Heerenveen - KS Amica Wronki 3-1 (17 September 1998)
 Biggest game: KS Amica Wronki - sc Heerenveen 0-1 (1 October 1998)
 Largest double result: sc Heerenveen - KS Amica Wronki 4-1 (1998)

 UEFA Cup
 Biggest home win: SC Heerenveen - Maccabi Petach Tikwa 5-0 (30 September 2004), SC Heerenveen - FC Baník Ostrava 5-0 (29 September 2005) and SC Heerenveen - FK Ventspils 5-0 (16 December 2009)
 Biggest game: Vitória Setúbal - sc Heerenveen 0-3 (14 September 2006)
 Largest double result: Helsingsborg IF - sc Heerenveen 8-6 (2007)

 Intertoto Cup
 Biggest home win: SC Heerenveen - Aalborg BK 8-2 (19 July 1997)
 Biggest score: Ton Pentre AFC - sc Heerenveen 0-7 (2 July 1995)
 Largest double result: FHK Liepajas Metalurgs - sc Heerenveen 4-8 (2001)

Women's team

In 2007, SC Heerenveen created a women's football team, which competes in the Vrouwen Eredivisie, and between 2012 and 2015 in the BeNe League. While it has ranked mostly in the table's bottom positions, in 2011 it reached the national cup's final, lost against AZ. Vivianne Miedema started her profesional career at Heerenveen.

See also 
 Dutch football league teams
 SC Heerenveen in European football

References

External links 

Official website of the supportsclub of sc Heerenveen 
Unofficial website of sc Heerenveen 
Unofficial website of sc Heerenveen 

 
Association football clubs established in 1920
1920 establishments in the Netherlands
Football clubs in the Netherlands
Football clubs in Heerenveen